Rosa 'New Zealand', also known as 'Aotearoa New Zealand', is a pink Hybrid tea rose rose cultivar, developed in New Zealand by Samuel McGredy IV in 1989. The rose was introduced  by McGredy Roses International (New Zealand) in 1991 as 'Aotearoa'.

History
'New Zealand' was developed by Samuel McGredy IV in New Zealand in 1989. The rose is a cross between Hybrid tea roses 'Harmonie' and 'Auckland Metro'. McGredy created a unique double name for the rose,  'Aotearoa New Zealand',  to honor the Maori and the European cultures of New Zealand on the occasion of the country's 150th anniversary. ‘Aotearoa’ means Land of the Long White Cloud in the Maori language.

Description
'New Zealand' is a medium tall upright shrub, 3 to 5 ft (91-152 cm) in height. Blooms are large with an average diameter of 4-5 in (10-12  cm) and have 25 to 34 petals. Petals are light pink on their upper sides with a darker peach pink on the reverse. Flowers have a strong, sweet fragrance and are displayed in single blooms or in clusters on long stems. Foliage is a dark, glossy green.

Awards
 Auckland rose of the year, (1990)
 Hamilton Best Hybrid tea, (1990)
 New Zealand fragrance award, (1990)
 Portland Gold Medal, (1996)

See also
Garden roses
Rose Hall of Fame
List of Award of Garden Merit roses
All-America Rose Selections

References

New Zealand
Products introduced in 1991